Géza Kiss (born Géza Klein; 22 October 1882, Salgótarján – 23 August 1952, Budapest) was a Hungarian freestyle swimmer who competed at the 1904 Summer Olympics and at the 1906 Intercalated Games. At the 1904 Olympics he won a silver medal in the 1 mile freestyle and a bronze medal in the 880 yard freestyle. Two years later, at the Intercalated Games, he won a gold medal as a member of Hungarian 4×250 m freestyle relay.

References

External links
 

1882 births
1952 deaths
Hungarian male swimmers
Hungarian male freestyle swimmers
Olympic silver medalists for Hungary
Olympic bronze medalists for Hungary
Olympic swimmers of Hungary
Olympic bronze medalists in swimming
Medalists at the 1904 Summer Olympics
Medalists at the 1906 Intercalated Games
Swimmers at the 1904 Summer Olympics
Swimmers at the 1906 Intercalated Games
Sportspeople from Borsod-Abaúj-Zemplén County
Olympic silver medalists in swimming
19th-century Hungarian people
20th-century Hungarian people